{{DISPLAYTITLE:MgCu2}}

MgCu2 is a binary intermetallic compound of magnesium (Mg) and copper (Cu) adopting cubic crystal structure, more specifically the C15 Laves phase. The space group of MgCu2 is Fdm with lattice parameter a = 7.04 Å.

Preparation
MgCu2 can be prepared by hydrogenation of Mg2Cu or the reaction of magnesium hydride and metallic copper at elevated temperature and pressure:

 2 Mg2Cu + 3 H2 → 3 MgH2 + MgCu2
 MgH2 + 2 Cu → MgCu2 + H2

MgCu2 can also be prepared by reacting of stoichiometric amounts of metals at about 380 °C in the presence of excess copper.

Properties
MgCu2 can react with boron or its oxide to form magnesium borides. It can also react with magnesium hydride to produce orthorhombic Mg2Cu, liberating hydrogen.

References

See also
 Laves phase

Magnesium compounds
Copper compounds
Intermetallics